The Flea Theater, founded in 1996, is a theater in the TriBeCa section of New York City.  It presents primarily new American theater and provides a venue for film stars to act on a very small (74-seat) stage, as well as a smaller black box theater for experimental and new works. The theater was founded by Jim Simpson, Mac Wellman, and Kyle Chepulis. The Flea earned early acclaim for original productions of post-9-11 play The Guys and political works by A. R. Gurney. According to the New York Times, “Since its inception in 1996, The Flea has presented over 100 plays and numerous dance and live music performances. Under Artistic Director Jim Simpson and Producing Director Carol Ostrow,  The Flea is one of New York’s leading off-off-Broadway companies."

History

Founded in 1996, the award-winning  Flea Theater was originally formed to create, according to the theatre's website, “a joyful hell in a small space”.  The Flea receives over 17,000 visitors each year.  In March 2015, The Flea announced that Niegel Smith would be taking over for Jim Simpson as its new artistic director.

Production highlights include Oh the Humanity and Other Exclamations, by Pulitzer finalist Will Eno, starring Marisa Tomei and Brian Hutchison. This collection of five short plays extended through winter 2008. Another recent Flea hit was Mrs. Farnsworth, a political comedy written for The Flea by renowned playwright A. R. Gurney, which was performed by Sigourney Weaver and John Lithgow. Mrs. Farnsworth won rave reviews and returned to The Flea for an encore in the fall. For two years in a row, The New York Times named a Flea production as one of the best Off-Broadway shows of the season—O Jerusalem in 2003 and Mrs. Farnsworth in 2004. Recent productions include The Great Recession: six plays commissioned by The Flea exploring the impact of the current economic crisis on the younger generation written by Thomas Bradshaw, Sheila Callaghan, Erin Courtney, Will Eno, Itamar Moses and Adam Rapp; Jonathan Reynolds's Girls in Trouble; and Bathsheba Doran's Parents’ Evening.

New Works
The Flea produces several original major productions each year. Flea artists have been honored with two OBIE Awards, an Otto Award and, in May 2004, The Flea was given a Drama Desk Award for Distinguished Achievement commending its dedication to adventurous theater.

Awards and recognition 
In 2010, The Flea was awarded the American Theatre Wing's National Theatre Company Grant.

See also

 Speculations: An Essay on the Theater
 Mac Wellman
 Performance art
 Performing Garage
 Elizabeth LeCompte
 The Wooster Group
 Ontological-Hysteric Theater
 Richard Foreman
 Richard Schechner
 Happenings
 Allan Kaprow
 Fluxus
 Intermedia
 Dick Higgins
 Marina Abramović
 Experimental theatre
 Avant-garde

References

External links

 

Theatre companies in New York City
Off-Off-Broadway
Tribeca
Arts organizations established in 1996
1996 establishments in New York City